Vincent Marissal is a Canadian politician, who was elected to the National Assembly of Quebec in the 2018 provincial election. He represents the electoral district of Rosemont as a member of Québec solidaire.

Background
Prior to being elected, Marissal was a journalist. His journalistic career began with La Voix de l'Est, a newspaper in Granby. Marissal later wrote for Le Soleil in Quebec City, covering the affairs of the National Assembly. He later worked for La Presse in Montreal, where he continued to cover politics while also authoring the newspaper's weekly wine column.

Electoral record

References

1966 births
Living people
People from Granby, Quebec
Politicians from Montreal
Journalists from Montreal
Québec solidaire MNAs
21st-century Canadian politicians
Université du Québec à Montréal alumni